Neomegaderus is a genus of beetles in the family Cerambycidae, containing the following species:

 Neomegaderus bifasciatus (Dupont, 1836)
 Neomegaderus stigma (Linnaeus, 1758)

References

Trachyderini